Rancho Pescadero was a  Mexican land grant in present-day Stanislaus County and San Joaquin County, California given in 1843 by Governor Manuel Micheltorena to Valentin Higuera and Rafael Feliz. Pescadero means "fishing place" in Spanish.  The grant extended along the west bank of the San Joaquin River from about Banta on the north to Del Puerto Creek and Rancho Del Puerto on the south, and encompassed present-day Grayson.

History
Valentin Higuera and Rafael Feliz were granted the eight square league Rancho Pescadero in 1843.  Valentin Higuera (1809-) was the son of José Loreto Higuera, grantee of Rancho Los Tularcitos   In 1829, Valentin Higuera  married Maria Margarita Sais (also spelled Saens or Saez) (1811-1850).  Valentin's brother, Fulgencio Higuera, was the grantee of Rancho Agua Caliente.  In 1845, Fulgencio Higuera married Maria Celia Feliz.  Antonio Rafael Feliz (1789-1850) was born in Los Angeles and died in San Jose.

Higuera sold the rancho to Hiram Grimes, Francis W. Grimes and William H. McKee in 1849.  Hiram Grimes was nephew of Captain Eliab Grimes, grantee of Rancho Del Paso. Hiram Grimes also owned Rancho San Juan.

With the cession of California to the United States following the Mexican-American War, the 1848 Treaty of Guadalupe Hidalgo provided that the land grants would be honored.  As required by the Land Act of 1851, a claim for Rancho Pescadero was filed with the Public Land Commission in 1852, and the grant was patented to Hiram Grimes, Francis W. Grimes and William H. McKee in 1858.

Historic sites of the Rancho
Site of San Joaquin City.  A river-streamer stopping town was established in 1849, which was replaced by Vernalis in 1888 with the coming of the Southern Pacific Railroad.

References

Pescadero (Grimes)
Ranchos of San Joaquin County, California
Ranchos of Stanislaus County, California
San Joaquin Valley
El Camino Viejo